Who Loves You?, released in 1998, is the sixth studio album from the artist, producer and composer Kashif Saleem. The album was released in 1998 on Expansion Records. The album includes two hits, "Bed You Down" and  "Mingo Weya".

Track listing

Personnel 
 Kashif – vocals, synthesizers, drum programming, arrangements 
 Chris Clairmont – guitars (1, 3-10), additional guitars (2)
 Dwayne Higgins – guitars (2), backing vocals (2)
 Larry Kimpel – bass (4)
 Kenny McCloud – additional drum programming (1, 4, 7, 8)
 Michael White – drums (4)
 Sheila E. – percussion (9, 10)
 Gerald Albright – saxophone (3)
 David Hart – harmonica (4)
 Johnny Britt – trumpet (9, 10)
 Sandford Stein – string arrangements (7)
 Bridgette Fiddmont – backing vocals (1, 7, 8)
 Lynne Fiddmont – backing vocals (1, 5, 7, 8)
 Kimaya Seward – backing vocals (2, 5, 6, 9, 10)
 Monty Seward – backing vocals (2, 6, 9, 10)
 Gary Taylor – backing vocals (3)
 Liz Hogue – backing vocals (7)

References

External links

Who Loves You? at Discogs

1998 albums
Kashif (musician) albums
Expansion Records albums